Teresa Maxwell-Conover (born Teresa Ryan; September 26, 1884 – September 1968) was an American actress in Broadway productions in the early 20th century. She was in motion pictures until the early 1940s, and was sometimes credited as Theresa Maxwell Conover. She was from Louisville, Kentucky.

Early years
Born and raised in Louisville, Kentucky, Maxwell-Conover was the daughter of Reverend Dan Ryan, an Episcopal or Methodist minister. She had a brother, Dolph Ryan.

When she was a child, Maxwell-Conover desired to be an actress enough that she performed on a stump to an audience of chickens and ducks on her uncle's property.

Stage career
With no acting experience, Maxwell-Conover went to New York seeking to become an actress. A personal visit with the author and manager of The Purple Lady, which was then being presented, led to her portraying Peggy Proudfoot in that play a few weeks later.

Maxwell-Conover was the leading lady in a stage production of The Purple Lady in New Orleans in 1899. She acted in Nashville, Tennessee, beginning in 1900 and continued there at least through 1902.

Maxwell-Conover's New York City debut came at the New Theatre in the four-act play, Nobody's Daughter, in February 1911. As "Mrs. Frampton" she was complimented by a reviewer in The New York Times for having rendered "a beautiful performance." He described her as "an actress of unusual distinction in appearance and manner, dresses exquisitely, and plays with great naturalness and simplicity a role somewhat indefinitely outlined by the dramatist."

She was in the company of Gertrude Elliott in the Charles Frohman produced comedy, Preserving Mr. Panmure, in February 1912. Written by Sir Arthur Wing Pinero, the play was presented to audiences at the Lyceum Theatre. Previously it enjoyed an extended run at the Comedy Theatre in London, England.

In September 1912 she was in the first David Belasco production in New York City. The Governor's Lady was staged by the Republic Theatre. Also in the Belasco company were Emma Dunn and Emmitt Corrigan.  Written by Alice Bradley, it had a very intense and emotional third act. The stage's impression of reality was heightened by a fine reproduction of a Childs Restaurant. The troupe traveled to the National Theatre in January 1913.

To-Day, a three-act play given at the 48th Street Theatre in October 1913, concentrates on the "worship of money" in the United States. Maxwell-Conover, as "Mrs Garland", and Emily Stevens, are applauded by a reviewer for their acting. The same observer thought the production was an "indecent, vicious play", particularly because of its "utterly malicious insinuations".

On December 15, 1913, Maxwell-Conover was at the Lyceum in The Cassillis Engagement with Alison Skipworth in the cast of players. This was a four-act comedy by St. John Hankin.

The Maxine Elliott Theatre hosted a comedy by Salisbury Field entitled The Rented Earl in February 1915. Lawrence D'Orsay, Maxwell-Conover, and Evelyn Carter were among the actors in a show which was presented twice daily except for Sunday. The farce tells about a group of social climbers who try to persuade an English nobleman to assist them in their activities. In April 1915 Conover-Maxwell was in a production of The Natural Law by Charles Sumner at the Republic Theatre, at 209 West 42nd Street, in midtown Manhattan. The play changed venues in September 1915. It moved to the York Theatre at 116th Street near Lenox Avenue. John Cort had recently added the York to his chain of playhouses which offered Broadway attractions to audiences at "popular" prices. Conrad Nagel was in the cast when the play came to the Loew's Lexington Theatre, 571 Lexington Avenue in October.

Emily Stevens was the leading lady in a Broadhurst Theatre production of The Madonna of the Future, which premiered in late January 1918. Maxwell-Conover acted the part of "Mrs. Van Duzen". Near the final curtain of the three-act comedy Maxwell-Conover spoke to Stevens, saying "You are so charming: you mean something! I don't in the least know what you mean, but that is what makes you charming." During the first two acts Stevens' character resolves to bear a child without being married. She announces this to her neighbors in Tarrytown, New York. The audience was shocked by the frankness of the language employed by the characters. Written by playwright Alan Dale, the dialogue "was brilliant". Her neighbors are further startled when Stevens delivers her baby, which comes to light in the comedy's second portion. In the third act she discovers that she loves the child's father and would rather marry him than see him wed someone else.

A critic was complimentary of the play's two sets which were representative of what was then a new art of "residential decoration" being employed on Broadway. The entire cast proved skilled in speaking their lines. The reviewer's overall impression was positive. He wrote that the production reminded him of the finest he had witnessed at the Morosco Theatre.

In Madonna of the Future Maxwell-Conover wore a frock of brown satin and lace. The skirt was draped low in zouave effect. The front panel was composed of brown mesh lace threaded in gold. The bodice was made of lace in back and satin in front. The waistline featured brown ribbon velvet. The costume was completed by a string of brown wooden beads and a flat sailor hat.

She was in plays which toured various cities by 1919. One of these was My Lady Friends (1919) with comedian Clifton Crawford. Maxwell-Conover starred with William Hodge in Fixing Sister in Fitchburg, Massachusetts in December 1926. She continued to play in theatrical productions after her motion picture career hit full stride in the 1920s. In 1928 she acted the role of the mother in Your Uncle Dudley while playing in a society comedy called The Last of Mrs. Cheney.

Films
Maxwell-Conover debuted as a film actress as "Mrs. Layton du Roc" in Just Sylvia (1918). She supported Elaine Hammerstein in The Daughter Pays (1920). Hammerstein played a woman who strives to maintain her family's finances despite having a mother who squanders money. Constance Talmadge was showcased in Polly of the Follies (1922). Maxwell-Conover is cast as a Long Island society woman in the First National Pictures comedy.

Brief Moment (1933) is a Carole Lombard and Gene Raymond movie based on a play. It was released by Columbia Pictures. Maxwell-Conover is a supporting actress who plays the part of "Mrs. Deane".  She played Mrs. Archer in the 1934 film The Age of Innocence.

Her later film appearances include Gallant Lady (1934), The Mighty Barnum (1934), Mississippi (1935), and Free and Easy'' (1941). Maxwell-Conover had uncredited parts in several other movies.

Personal
She was married to Wall Street broker John Thompson Conover III.

She enjoyed outdoor sports and activities, especially horseback riding.

Filmography

Sources

 
 
 
 
 
 
 
 
 
 
 
 
 
 .

Notes

References

External links

1884 births
1968 deaths
American stage actresses
Vaudeville performers
American film actresses
American silent film actresses
American women comedians
Actresses from Louisville, Kentucky
People from Richmond, Indiana
20th-century American actresses
20th-century American comedians